Four Ways may refer to:

Four Ways Restaurant, former name of Fraser Mansion, Dupont Circle neighborhood, Washington, D.C.
 Four Ways, Queensland, a locality in the Shire of Cloncurry, Queensland, Australia
 Four Ways (album), a 2017 album by Roscoe Mitchell
 Fourways, an area of Johannesburg, South Africa